Arnold Jackson (born April 9, 1977) is a former professional American football player who played wide receiver for two seasons for the Arizona Cardinals.

The first player in college football history to total 300 career receptions.

References

1977 births
American football wide receivers
Arizona Cardinals players
Louisville Cardinals football players
Living people